Ahmed Jahanzeb Usmani (born 28 May 1978) is a Pakistani pop singer and composer. 

Known also as AJ and Wonderboy as he released his first record at a very young age of 8, he was born in Karachi, Sindh, Pakistan. Jahanzeb is one of the few singers of the country, who have been trained in classical music and that is why he mostly sings soul stirring slow songs. Jahanzeb was trained under the guidance of Ustad Rais Khan, who made him his shagird (pupil) in a ceremony called Rasm-e-Gandha Bandhi held at the Sheraton Hotel in 1988. The ceremony, one of its kind to be ever held in Pakistan, was attended by celebrities, dignitaries and media people.

Live concerts
Ahmed Jahanzeb is a familiar name in the touring circuit of Pakistani pop singers, He has done over 2000 shows and has shared the stage with musicians like AR Rahman, Sonu Nigam, Sunidhi Chauhan, Ali Azmat and Strings (band).

Coke Studio (Pakistan) artist
Ahmed Jahanzeb made his debut on Coke Studio (Pakistan) in 2016 as one of their featured artists. He also has his own studio producing documentaries and films for television.

Albums and OSTs
 Wonder Boy (album) (1987)
 Parastish (2003)
 Daira (album) (2004)
 Burning Borders-BBC (2005)
 Laut Aao (2008)
 Khuda aur Muhabbat (2011)

OSTs and singles
 Coke Studio Pakistan (2017) – Allah hu Akbar featuring Shafqat Amanat Ali, Ahmed Jahanzeb
 Coke Studio Pakistan (2016) – Khaki Banda featuring Umair Jaswal, Ahmed Jahanzeb
 Piya Ke Duwaaray – OST Dusri Biwi (2014)
 Laila Majnoon – OST (2000)
 Ik Baar Kaho Tum Meri Ho – Single (2001–2002)
 Sheeshay Ka Mahal – OST (2003)
   Tu Jo Nahi
 Mujhay Pyar Chahye – OST (2004)
 Dard Itna Tha – OST (2005)
 Ajeeb Zindagi Hai – Single (2006)
 Socha Na Tha – Single (2006)
 Aisa Bhi Hota Hai – OST (2007)
 Hamaray Hain feat. Shuja Haider – OST Khuda Kay Liye (2007)
 Bandya Ho featuring Shuja Haider – OST Khuda Kay Liye (2007)
 Tiluk Kamod OST – Khuda Kay Liye (2007)
 Teri Aag
 Mumkin Hai OST – Bol (2010)
 ..Ik Nai Dunya.... OST 
 Sab Se Pehle Pakistan

Filmography

References

External links

 
 'Hot Seat' an interview of Ahmed Jahanzeb – Dawn (newspaper) Archived
 Parastish Album Review – DAWN.com 
 Ahmed Jehanzeb @ Jhoom.com
 @ Ahmed Jahanzed Albums

1978 births
Living people
Pakistani pop singers
Pakistani composers
People from Karachi
Pakistani male television actors
Musicians from Karachi
Male actors from Karachi
Pakistani playback singers
Coke Studio (Pakistani TV program)